HVB may refer to:
 Hervey Bay Airport, in Queensland, Australia
 Holmestrand–Vittingfoss Line, an abandoned railway line in Norway
 HypoVereinsbank, a German financial institution